René Philippe Kouassi (born 14 December 1979 in Adzopé, Côte d'Ivoire) is an Ivorian archer. He competed in the individual event at the 2012 Summer Olympics. At the 2016 Summer Olympics, he again competed in the individual event where he was defeated by Jean-Charles Valladont of France during the first round. He was the flag bearer during the closing ceremony.

References

External links
 

Ivorian male archers
1979 births
Living people
Archers at the 2012 Summer Olympics
Archers at the 2016 Summer Olympics
Olympic archers of Ivory Coast
People from Adzopé